Ardiles Rumbiak (born 1 May 1986) is an Indonesian footballer who currently plays for PSBS Biak Numfor in the Liga Indonesia Premier Division (LI).

References

External links

1986 births
Association football midfielders
Living people
People from Biak
Indonesian footballers
Liga 1 (Indonesia) players
Indonesian Super League-winning players
Persipura Jayapura players
Sriwijaya F.C. players
Indonesian Premier Division players
PSBS Biak Numfor players
Sportspeople from Papua